The Mighty Orinoco is a novel by French writer Jules Verne (1828–1905), first published in 1898 as a part of the Voyages Extraordinaires. It tells the story of young Jeanne's journey up the Orinoco River in Venezuela with her protector, Sergeant Martial, in order to find her father, Colonel de Kermor, who disappeared some years before.

Gallery

External links

1898 French novels
Novels by Jules Verne
Novels set in Venezuela
French bildungsromans
French novels adapted into films